Vincent Brümmer (30 December 1932 – 30 March 2021) was a South African-born Christian theologian who worked for most of his career in the Netherlands. From 1967 to 1997 he was the Professor of Philosophy of Religion at the University of Utrecht.

Brummer was born in Stellenbosch. He held degrees from Stellenbosch University, Harvard, and Utrecht University, also working as a research assistant at the University of Oxford for a year (1961-1962). On 27 May 1994 Brümmer received an honorary doctorate from the Faculty of Theology at Uppsala University, Sweden. In 1998, he received an honorary doctorate in divinity from Durham University.

Brümmer died on 30 March 2021, aged 88.

Further reading
 Brümmer on meaning and the Christian faith: collected writings of Vincent Brümmer. Vincent Brümmer, Ed. John R. Hinnells. Ashgate Publishing, 2006. .
 Christian faith and philosophical theology: essays in honour of Vincent Brümmer presented on the occasion of the twenty-fifth anniversary of his professorship in the philosophy of religion in the University of Utrecht. Eds. Gijsbert van den Brink, Luco J. van den Brom, Marcel Sarot. Kok Pharos Pub. House, 1992. .
 Theology and Philosophical Inquiry: an Introduction. Vincent Brümmer. Westminster John Knox, 1982. .
 Speaking of a Personal God: an Essay in Philosophical Theology. Vincent Brümmer. Cambridge University Press, 1992. .
 The Model of Love: a Study in Philosophical Theology. Vincent Brümmer. Cambridge University Press, 1993. .
 Atonement, Christology and the Trinity: Making Sense of Christian Doctrine. Vincent Brümmer. Ashgate Publishing, 2005. .
 What are we doing when we pray? a Philosophical Inquiry. Vincent Brümmer. (1st published SCM, 1984). Ashgate Publishing, 2008. .
 Interpreting the Universe as Creation: a Dialogue of Science and Religion. Vincent Brümmer. Kok Pharos Pub. House, 1991. .
 Transcendental Criticism and Christian Philosophy: a Presentation and evaluation of Herman Dooyeweerd's "philosophy of the cosmonomic idea" (University Utrecht, Ph.D. thesis, 1961)

References

Brümmer's Worldcat identity
Brümmer's bio

1932 births
2021 deaths
South African philosophers
Philosophers of religion
Academic staff of Utrecht University
People from Stellenbosch
Harvard University alumni
Utrecht University alumni
South African expatriates in the Netherlands
Afrikaner people